The Wade Trophy is an award presented annually to the best upperclass women's basketball player in National Collegiate Athletic Association (NCAA) Division I competition. It is named after three–time national champion Delta State University coach Lily Margaret Wade. The award debuted in 1978 as the first–ever women's national player of the year award in college basketball. State Farm Insurance sponsors the award, and the trophy is presented at the Women's Basketball Coaches Association (WBCA) National Convention.

UConn has the most all-time winners with nine. Maya Moore is the only player to win the Wade Trophy three times, accomplishing the feat in 2009 (only sophomore ever to win the award), 2010 and 2011. Other multiple award winners include Nancy Lieberman (1979, 1980), Seimone Augustus (2005, 2006), Brittney Griner (2012, 2013), and fellow UConn alum Breanna Stewart (2015, 2016), and University of Oregon standout Sabrina Ionescu (2019, 2020).

Baylor is in sole possession of second in total awards, and is in a second-place tie with two other schools for the most individual recipients. Three Baylor players have combined to win four awards. The other two programs with three individual recipients are Louisiana Tech and Texas, with all of each school's winners having received the award once. There have never been any ties for the award.

Eligibility and criteria
All academically eligible women's basketball athletes, except freshmen, in NCAA Division I qualify as candidates.

Member of the NCAA Division I Kodak/WBCA All-America Team
Game and season statistics
Effect on team
Leadership
Character
Overall playing ability
Player that embodies the "Spirit of Margaret Wade" as defined by the WBCA and the NAGWS

Winners

See also

 List of sports awards honoring women

References

External links
Official website

College basketball player of the year awards in the United States
College basketball trophies and awards in the United States
College women's basketball in the United States
Sports awards honoring women
Awards established in 1978
1978 establishments in the United States
College sports trophies and awards in the United States
State Farm